Jenks High School is a secondary school located within Tulsa County in Jenks, Oklahoma, United States. It serves students from the town of Jenks and students from the south side of the city of Tulsa. The high school has over 2,800 students in grades 10–12, with the attached Freshman Academy the high school campus has over 3,600 students.

Demographics
As of 2017, the average household income in the district was $100,600, compared with the state average of $65,400.
As of 2018, 54% of students are white, 7% are Native American, 7% are black, 11% are Asian, and 13% are Hispanic, and 7% are more than one race.

Academics
Jenks High School regularly has the most National Merit Scholars of any public school in the state, including 20 in 2016.  The school has produced three presidential scholars since 2001. The college-going rate was 63.8%, compared with the state average of 50.9%.  
The average ACT test score was 23.8, compared with the state average of 20.8 and the national average of 21.

Athletics and OSSAA sponsored activities
Jenks football program won the 3A state championship in 1979 followed by a 5A state championship in 1982, and the Oklahoma 6A high school football championship in 1993, 1996–2001, 2003, 2006, 2007, 2012–2015, 2020, and 2021 for a total of 18 state championships. The 1997 team, which went 14–0 and outscored its opponents 535–118, is considered one of the greatest high school football teams in the history of Oklahoma. R. Perry Beaver served as head football coach from 1977 to 1991.

Jenks High School football has produced NFL players Rocky Calmus, Sean Mahan, Garrett Mills, Phillip Dillard, Jerry Wisne, and Chase Beeler among others. Jenks High School baseball has produced MLB all-star Josh Johnson.

The Trojan athletic and non-athletic programs have won 189 state championships in various OSSAA sponsored sports and non-athletic events, as well as state championships in non-OSSAA sports such as gymnastics, hockey, and rugby.

The following is a list of the OSSAA sports and OSSAA non-athletic events in which the school compete, as well as the years, if any, during which the school's team won the state championship:

 Academic Bowl – 4 (2008, 2009, 2010, 2022)
 Baseball 4 (1997, 2000, 2002, 2021)
 Boys Basketball – 0
 Girls Basketball – 5 (1991, 2000, 2001, 2003, 2004)
 Cheerleading – 3 (2010, 2019, 2021)
 Boys Cross Country – 15 (1984, 1986, 1988, 1989, 1990, 1991, 1992, 1993, 1994, 1998, 2003, 2012, 2013, 2014, 2015)
 Girls Cross Country – 16 (1985, 1987, 1988, 1989, 1990, 1994, 1995, 1999, 2000, 2001, 2002, 2006, 2010, 2012, 2019, 2021)
 Debate – 4 (2003, 2007, 2012, 2015)
 Football – 18 (1979, 1982, 1993, 1996, 1997, 1998, 1999, 2000, 2001, 2003, 2006, 2007, 2012, 2013, 2014, 2015, 2020, 2021)
 Boys Golf – 8 (1994, 1997, 1999, 2000, 2001, 2002, 2003, 2004)
 Girls Golf – 15 (1982, 1983, 1987, 1988, 1993, 1994, 1995, 1996, 2004, 2005, 2006, 2007, 2009, 2010, 2022)
 Boys Soccer – 6 (1987, 1989, 1990, 1991, 2006, 2019)
 Girls Soccer – 9 (1988, 1993, 1999, 2000, 2001, 2002, 2003, 2006, 2009)
 Fastpitch Softball – 0
 Slowpitch Softball – 1 (2011)
 Boys Swimming – 19 (1991, 1992, 1996, 1997, 1998, 1999, 2000, 2001, 2002, 2003, 2004, 2007, 2008, 2009, 2010, 2011, 2017, 2019, 2020, 2021, 2022)
 Girls Swimming – 13 (1990, 1991, 1992, 1994, 2002, 2003, 2004, 2005, 2008, 2009, 2010, 2020, 2021, 2023)
 Boys Tennis – 16 (1991, 1992, 1993, 1994, 1995, 1996, 1997, 1998, 1999, 2000, 2004, 2007, 2015, 2017, 2021, 2022)
 Girls Tennis – 18 (1986, 1989, 1991, 1995, 1996, 1998, 1999, 2000, 2004, 2005, 2007, 2008, 2010, 2011, 2013, 2014, 2015, 2017)
 Boys Track – 7 (1999, 2000, 2001, 2002, 2003, 2004, 2014)
 Girls Track – 8 (1995, 1997, 1998, 2001, 2002, 2015, 2021, 2022)
 Volleyball – 4 (1996, 1997, 2006, 2014)
 Wrestling – 0
 Boys Volleyball – 5 (1978, 1981, 1982, 1984, 1986)
 One Act – 2 (1986, 1988)

Music

Marching band
The Jenks Trojan Pride, participated in the 2016 Rose Parade in Pasadena, California. It also participated in the Bandfest at Pasadena City College on December 30, 2015.

In November 2018, Trojan Pride was a first-time finalist in the Bands of America Grand Nationals at Lucas Oil Stadium in Indianapolis, Indiana.

Show choir
JHS has two competitive show choirs, the mixed-gender Trojanaires and the all-female Trojan Spirit. Trojanaires has made it to national-level competitions.

Notable alumni
Darwin Thompson, NFL football player
Chase Beeler, NFL football player
Jennifer Berry, Miss America 2006
Jim Bridenstine, U.S. House of Representative member, 2013–2018; NASA Administrator, 2018-current
Trey Callaway, Hollywood writer/producer/showrunner
Rocky Calmus, NFL football player 
Brad Carson, U.S. House of Representatives member, 2001 to 2005
Phillip Dillard, NFL football player
Georgia Frazier, Miss Oklahoma 2015
Alecia Holden, contestant on the 32nd season of Survivor
Brian Chad Johnson, TV personality
Josh Johnson, MLB All-Star pitcher for the Florida/Miami Marlins, Toronto Blue Jays, and San Diego Padres.
Ben Lamb, professional poker player
Sean Mahan, NFL football player
Garrett Mills, NFL football player
Brian Nhira, contestant on season 10 of The Voice
Steven Parker, NFL football player
Brian Presley, actor
Jerry Wisne, NFL football player
AleXa (real name Alexandra Christine Schneiderman), K-pop idol under ZB Label.

Sources

External links
C-SPAN Q&A interview with JHS broadcast journalism teacher Clifton Raphael, August 14, 2016

Public high schools in Oklahoma
Schools in Tulsa County, Oklahoma